In functional analysis, the Grothendieck trace theorem is an extension of Lidskii's theorem about the trace and the determinant of a certain class of nuclear operators on Banach spaces, the so-called -nuclear operators. The theorem was proven in 1966 by Alexander Grothendieck. Lidskii's theorem does not hold in general for Banach spaces.

The theorem should not be confused with the Grothendieck trace formula from algebraic geometry.

Grothendieck trace theorem

⅔-nuclear operators

Grothendiecks trace theorem

Let  denote the eigenvalues of  counted with their algebraic multiplicities. If

then the following equalities hold:

and for the Fredholm determinant

See also

Literature

References

Functional analysis
Topological tensor products